The honey bee life cycle, here referring exclusively to the domesticated Western honey bee, depends greatly on their social structure.

Honey bee colony life
Unlike a bumble bee colony or a paper wasp colony, the life of a honey bee colony is perennial. The three types of honey bees in a hive are: queens (egg-producers), workers (non-reproducing females), and drones (males whose main duty is to find and mate with a queen). Unlike the worker bees the drones do not sting. Honey bee larvae hatch from eggs in three to four days. They are then fed by worker bees and develop through several stages in the cells. Cells are capped by worker bees when the larva pupates. Queens and drones are larger than workers, so require larger cells to develop. A colony may typically consist of tens of thousands of individuals.

Development

Development from egg to emerging bee varies among queens, workers, and drones. Queens emerge from their cells in 15–16 days, workers in 21 days, and drones in 24 days.  Only one queen is usually present in a hive. New virgin queens develop in enlarged cells through differential feeding of royal jelly by workers. When the existing queen ages or dies or the colony becomes very large, a new queen is raised by the worker bees. When the hive is too large, the old queen will take half the colony with her in a swarm. This occurs a few days prior to the new queen emerging. If several queens emerge they will begin piping (a high buzzing noise) signaling their location for the other virgin queens to come fight. Once one has eliminated the others, she will go around the hive chewing the sides of any other queen cells and stinging and killing the pupae. The queen takes one or several nuptial flights to mate with drones from other colonies, which die after mating. After mating the queen begins laying eggs. A fertile queen is able to lay fertilized or unfertilized eggs.  Each unfertilized egg contains a unique combination of 50% of the queen's genes and develops into a (haploid) drone. The fertilized eggs develop into either (diploid) workers or virgin queens (if fed exclusively royal jelly).

Every honey bee (Apis mellifera) in a hive exists to perform specific duties determined by their sex and age. Like every member of its colony, the nurse honey bee plays a vital role in the survival of its hive. Nurse bees are charged with the care and feeding of the queen and the next generation.

The average lifespan of a queen is three to four years; drones usually die upon mating or are expelled from the hive before the winter; and workers may live for a few weeks in the summer and several months in areas with an extended winter.

The weight progression of the worker egg, larva:

See also
Bee bole
Bee colonies
Winter cluster

Sources

Development of honeybees bee-info.com, accessed Oct 2005

Temporal Polyethism in Bees
The Beekeepers

External links
Life cycle information by the FAO

Beekeeping